Elkhorn Creek is a stream in McDonald County in the U.S. state of Missouri. It is a tributary of Indian Creek.

The stream headwaters arise at  just east of Missouri Route 76 south of Longview.

Some say Elkhorn Creek was named for elk in the area, while others believe the name is a transfer from a creek of the same name in Letcher County, Kentucky.

See also
List of rivers of Missouri

References

Rivers of McDonald County, Missouri
Rivers of Missouri